Lockheed Martin Canada is an aerospace and defence contractor, headquartered in Ottawa, Ontario, Canada. It is a wholly owned subsidiary of Lockheed Martin, with over 1200 employees across facilities in Montreal, Quebec, Halifax, Nova Scotia, and Victoria, British Columbia with a corporate office in Ottawa, Ontario. Field staff are also deployed at select Canadian Forces' sites and bases.

Lockheed Martin Canada is a leader in platform delivery, systems integration, technology & software development, large scale program management, training, in-service support and sustainment. They partner with Canadian government, military, and industry on a variety of crucial defence and security programs.

Some of its current Department of National Defence programs include: the design team lead for the Canadian Surface Combatants; the Combat/Command Management Systems provider and integrator for Canada's Joint Support Ships, Arctic and Offshore Patrol Ships, and Halifax-class modernization; delivery of the Cyclone for the Canadian Maritime Helicopter Program; in-service support for the RCAF CC-130J. Lockheed Martin Canada is also pursuing the Future Fighter Capability Project with the proposal of Lockheed Martin's F-35 Lightning II, and Canada's Future Aircrew Training Program as part of the SkyAlyne team.

In addition, Lockheed Martin Canada has a world-class engine maintenance, repair and overhaul (MRO) facility in Montreal known as Lockheed Martin Commercial Engine Solutions (CES). Capabilities include comprehensive engine MRO, test, component repair, on-wing services, and customized engine builds for military and commercial operators. Located in Calgary is Lockheed Martin CDL Systems, which specializes in the development and licensing of vehicle control station software for unmanned systems. Lockheed Martin CDL Systems has developed an open, standards-based, and commercial off-the-shelf software product that has been integrated into numerous unmanned vehicle platforms. The company’s products are designed on low-cost, interoperable, and open architecture systems to support government and civil applications around the world, with more than one million hours of operational use.  

Lockheed Martin Canada has been ranked a top R&D company in Canada by the Globe and Mail each year and since 2017 it has had over $134M R&D investment. Through both direct R&D investment and offset enabled innovation thanks to the Government of Canada's Industrial and Technological Benefits Policy, Lockheed Martin contributes extensively to R&D to the Canadian aerospace and defence industry. Lockheed Martin Canada has also invested over $3 million in support of Canadian science, technology, engineering, and mathematics (STEM) education, Military & Veteran causes, and community initiatives since 2014. Annual it supports between 10-15 organizations at the local and national levels.

References

External links
 Lockheed Martin Canada

Canadian subsidiaries of foreign companies
Lockheed Martin
Manufacturing companies based in Ottawa